Bar Aftab-e Chah Dowpowk (also Romanized as Bar Āftāb-e Chāh Dowpowk) is a village in Susan-e Gharbi Rural District, Susan District, Izeh County, Khuzestan Province, Iran. At the 2006 census, its population was 140, in 20 families.

References 

Populated places in Izeh County